Yury Yuryevich Morozov (born 23 October 1985) is a Russian former professional football player.

Club career
He made his professional debut for FC Shinnik Yaroslavl on 20 April 2005 in a Russian Cup game against FC Zenit Saint Petersburg.

He made his Russian Football National League debut for FC Dynamo Bryansk on 27 March 2010 in a game against FC Shinnik Yaroslavl.

External links
 

1985 births
Sportspeople from Mykolaiv
Living people
Russian footballers
FC Olimpia Volgograd players
FC Tyumen players
FC Tekstilshchik Ivanovo players
Association football defenders
FC Shinnik Yaroslavl players
FC Nizhny Novgorod (2015) players
FC Avangard Kursk players
FC Dynamo Bryansk players
FC Chertanovo Moscow players
Russian First League players
Russian Second League players